Barbaro Julio Fernández (born August 29, 1954) is a Cuban-American guitarist and composer best known as the current and longtime guitarist for the jazz-fusion band Spyro Gyra.

Fernández was born in Havana, Cuba, but grew up in Hoboken, New Jersey, where he started playing guitar at the age of nine. Fernández graduated from Hoboken High School in 1972 and attended Montclair State University as a music major.

Before finding paid work as a musician, Fernández worked at various times as a clothing salesman, a messenger in a law firm, a newspaper delivery man and a labourer in a coat factory.

In 1984, his friend Gerardo Velez, Fernández's collaborator on various projects and the percussionist for Spyro Gyra at that time, told him the band was looking for a new guitarist. Fernández auditioned and was hired the next day—an event he described as "one of the happiest days of my life." Except for a short hiatus at the end of that decade, Fernandez has continued in that position.

Fernández has also worked for a variety of other musicians, including Bernie Williams, Chuck Loeb, Dave Samuels, Phoebe Snow, Richie Cannata, David Broza, Eric Marienthal, B.B. King, Emmanuel and Marion Meadows.

References

1954 births
Living people
American jazz guitarists
Hoboken High School alumni
Montclair State University alumni
Musicians from New Jersey
People from Hoboken, New Jersey